A Failure of Capitalism: The Crisis of '08 and the Descent into Depression is a 2009 book by the economist Richard Posner. The text was initially published on May 1, 2009, by Harvard University Press. Posner criticizes President George W. Bush and his administration's policies and the response to the fiscal crisis, and moves away from his past well-known advocacy of free-market capitalism.  The book has been primarily noted not for his criticism of progressive government policies (which he attacks again for good measure), but rather his critique of laissez-faire capitalism and its ideologues.

The book has been received with generally good reviews from the press, including The New York Times, but the reception has not been universally positive.

Synopsis
The primary argument of the book is that we have gone from a recession into a depression (the "D" word, as one author calls it) in 2009, and Posner suggests several possible short-term and long-term solutions to this fiscal crisis.  His thesis is not that government, politicians, or even bankers primarily caused this depression, but rather that the capitalist system is to blame for its own faults.

Some of the causes of the depression that Posner cites are the lack of enforceable usury laws, which would discourage risky loans, the Federal Deposit Insurance Corporation (FDIC) and central banks taking risks, securitization of mortgages, illiquidity and insolvency of the banking system, the housing bubble, blindness to warning signs of a crisis, and the preconceptions of ideology.

Posner wraps up the book with a chapter containing several suggestions, including eventual re-regulation of the banking industry, but warns that "this is not the time" to do so — a long-term solution after the economy recovers — that can "wait calmer days."  He also suggests putting off reorganization of the Treasury and the Federal Reserve until a later time.  In the meanwhile, he writes, "piecemeal reforms may be feasible and helpful."  These include a halt on government marketing of home ownership, requiring banks and financial institutions to "disclose the full compensation of all senior executives", backloading of compensation, increasing marginal income tax rates on the highest incomes, and usury laws to discourage risky loans.

Criticism of George W. Bush
The book is significant in Posner's criticism of President George W. Bush and his administration's policies and the response to the fiscal crisis.  Part of the shock is due to Posner's longtime "conservative" views.  Judge Posner was nominated to the Seventh Circuit by Ronald Reagan, but is "no party man."

Posner starts his criticism of Bush with a broad attack on his behavior in his final months as President:

Posner blames Bush for pushing policies, such as the "ownership society", a $10 trillion national debt and "the huge budget deficits run by the Bush administration", "prop[ping] up stock prices by keeping interest rates low," which were underlying causes of the crisis, as well as "Dithering" in late 2008.  By the ownership society, Posner referred to the American Dream Down Payment Act of 2003 and other laws that made ownership easier.

Posner points out that Bush's proposed privatization of Social Security would have made the depression even more harmful.  Posner states that one of the "lessons learned" is that the "blurred" line between "the government and the private sector ... in the Bush Administration" contributed to a lack of insight into the underlying problems.  Even more so, "the emphatically pro-business philosophy of the Bush administration made the SEC too trusting of the securities industry."  The bottom line is that "there might not have been a depression had it not been for the Bush administration's mismanagement of the economy."

Criticism of capitalism and mainstream economists
Posner, famous for his advocacy of free markets, turns on free-market capitalism in this book: "the financial crisis is indeed a crisis of capitalism rather than a failure of government."  Posner explicitly states that he has changed his mind, that in the words of economist Robert Lucas, "that macroeconomics in this original sense has succeeded."  Posner states that:

Posner points out that one of the causes of the depression was "blindness to warning signs" of a crisis.  A few people had warned of problems, including analyst Meredith Whitney, investment advisers like Gary Shilling, Peter Schiff, and Marc Faber, and economists Stephen Roach, Robert Shiller, and Nouriel Roubini, and Brooksley Born, but they were ignored.  He asserts that the "depression is a failure of capitalism".

This is the second and most powerful shock.  The New York Times points out that:

Spreading the blame: critiques of Bill Clinton, Barack Obama, et al.
Posner also assigns part of the blame for the recession on the administration of Bill Clinton.  He says they were to blame for pushing policies that created the housing bubble.  The training and experience of several Clinton advisors, notably Robert Rubin, were tilted towards Wall Street, which he found to be ultimately dangerous.  Likewise, Alan Greenspan, Clinton's appointee as chairman of the Federal Reserve, gets a special blame for pushing low interest rates, which increased stock prices and led, in turn, to the bubbles in banking, stocks, and housing.

Posner sweeps a wide swath in assigning portions of blame for causing the underlying recession on a variety of factors and persons.  He praises the use of specific deterrence in shaming debtors, which, in his mind, has not been used enough recently.  He faults the concept of limited liability for increasing risk.  He points out the harmful focus on short-term profits at the expenses of long-term stability.  Bad credit was, in Posner's words, given a "so what?" attitude.

Clinton and the Democratic leadership in Congress encouraged home ownership by people who had bad credit and should have, in Posner's view, remained tenants.  Competition in the banking industry led to deregulation in Clinton's administration, and enactment of the Gramm-Leach-Bliley Act, which increased risk to the system.  Posner is not alone in criticizing the Gramm-Leach-Bliley Act; some economists, including Nobel laureate Joseph Stiglitz also believe it helped create the 2007 financial crisis.  Encouraging the practice of "sweeps" by large investors (removing money from demand deposits into money market funds overnight) exacerbated the problem.

Preconceptions and ideology held by both sides of the spectrum, argues the book, prevented novel challenges to changing fiscal realities.  Macroeconomics has not made use of chaos theory, and thus says Posner, the signal-noise ratio prevented a clear analysis and even created "blindness" and "misinformation" for policy analysts.

Posner went on the record against how Barack Obama's administration's Keynesian stimulus in the ARRA "could have been better designed," and specifically demurs against some of Obama's statements:

Nonetheless, Posner points out that what is rational for an individual corporation may not be rational for the industry as a whole.

Reception
Reviewing for The New York Times, Jonathan Rauch wrote that:

The Huffington Post gave a long review, noting with a bit of schadenfreude that Posner had changed his views.  Michael Casey, in a  review published in the Irish Times, writes "Blaming the system is a cop-out.... Posner’s approach is far too deterministic", and further calls the book "[a]n incomplete analysis of a floundering social system."

In The Washington Post, Paul M. Barrett, an assistant managing editor of Business Week,  writes that Posner seems to spread the blame too much, denigrates mere stupidity and "greed" as causes, and lacks "constructive proposals for reform...."  Barrett points out how notable this book is, which is that "his critique is bracing, all the more so because it comes from a right-leaning thinker normally hostile to the ministrations of government bureaucrats."

The New York Review of Books said that "it is at best a partial success; it gets some things right and some things wrong, and the items on both sides of the ledger are important."  In the Review, Nobel Prize–winning economist Robert Solow praises the author quite faintly:

Solow's review itself was notable to some degree, according to Brad DeLong, who critiqued Posner's logic along the way:

In an interview with The Economist, Posner was forced to defend his use of the term "depression" and his move "to the centre..."

Forbes magazine printed the preface of the book as a measure of its importance.

In January 2010, The New Yorker revisited A Failure of Capitalism, noting that by September 2009, Posner had become a confirmed Keynesian: "As acts of betrayal go, this was roughly akin to Johnny Damon's shaving off his beard, forsaking the Red Sox Nation, and joining the Yankees."

See also
 Criticism of capitalism
 American Dream Down Payment Act of 2003

Notes

References
 2009. A Failure of Capitalism: The Crisis of '08 and the Descent into Depression,

External links
 Chinese edition of A Failure of Capitalism
 Official Publication webpage at Harvard University website
 Official Becker-Posner blog
 

2009 non-fiction books
Books by Richard Posner
English-language books
Harvard University Press books
Law and economics
Law books
Philosophy of law